Laura C. Pantelakos (born August 12, 1935) is an American politician in the state of New Hampshire. She is a member of the New Hampshire House of Representatives, sitting as a Democrat from the Rockingham 25 district, having been first elected in 1978. She is currently the longest-serving member of the chamber.

References

1935 births
Living people
Democratic Party members of the New Hampshire House of Representatives
20th-century American politicians
20th-century American women politicians
21st-century American politicians
21st-century American women politicians
People from Bath, Maine
Politicians from Portsmouth, New Hampshire
Women state legislators in New Hampshire